Diadelioides is a genus of longhorn beetles of the subfamily Lamiinae, containing the following species:

 Diadelioides bipunctatus Breuning, 1940
 Diadelioides camerunensis Breuning, 1942
 Diadelioides crassepuncta Breuning, 1940
 Diadelioides exiguus Breuning, 1943
 Diadelioides ghesquierei Breuning, 1952
 Diadelioides glabricollis Breuning, 1947
 Diadelioides lateraliplagiatus Breuning, 1940
 Diadelioides minor Breuning, 1940
 Diadelioides similis Breuning, 1940
 Diadelioides strandi Breuning, 1940
 Diadelioides unicolor Breuning, 1940

References

Desmiphorini